The 2011 PFF League (PFFL) was the 8th season of second tier of Pakistan Football Federation. The season started on 22 November 2011 and concluded on 20 December 2011.

Teams
A total of 17 teams will contest the league. 10 teams played via departmental route and 7 played from club route.

Relegation (pre-season)
Sui Southern Gas and Young Blood were relegated from 2010–11 Pakistan Premier League season. 

Teams relegated from the 2010–11 Pakistan Premier League
 Sui Southern Gas
 Young Blood

Teams

Club phase

Group stages

Group A

Group B

Final stage (Club)

Departmental phase

Group stages

Group A

Group B

Final stage (Departmental)

Federation League finals

Top goalscorers
.

References

Pakistan Football Federation League seasons
1
Pakistan